The Texas Early Music Project is a performing arts ensemble based in Austin, Texas, that focuses on bringing audiences a closer knowledge and appreciation of Baroque music, Medieval music, Renaissance music, and early Classical-period music. The group uses historical instruments in keeping with historically informed performance practice.  The ensemble was founded in 1987 by Daniel Johnson, who remains the group's artistic director. The group is classified as a non-profit organization (501(c)3) and operates primarily on grant money and donations for individual and corporate supporters.  Income is supplemented by ticket sales and merchandise sales. Texas Early Music Project is a member of Early Music America.  Performers are primarily professional musicians from the Austin area, although performers visit from Texas at large, from all over the United States, and occasionally internationally.

History

The Texas Early Music project was initially conceived of as an opportunity for student members of The University of Texas at Austin Early Music Ensemble to work and perform with professional musicians, allowing them to explore a wider repertoire and gain performance experience. Over the years, growing popularity and an increased awareness of early music have led to the group's establishment as a prominent presence in the Austin music community, and the group regularly hosts performances in the Austin area at several different venues.

Performances

Between 1995 and 2002, TEMP's orchestra performed in several productions with the UT Opera Theater, including Purcell's Dido and Aeneas, "Baroque and Loving It" (a pastiche of selections from the works of Lully, Rameau, Cavalli, Cesti, and others, arranged by conductor Daniel Johnson), Cavalli's L'Ormindo, Monteverdi's Coronation of Poppea, and Handel's Alcina and Rinaldo. TEMP has performed at the Early Music Weekend at Round Top Festival Institute, appears regularly at the Texas Early Music Festival in Palestine, Texas, and contributed a performance to the Mostly Music Marathon (benefiting AIDS Services of Austin).

In 1998, TEMP became a member of the Austin Circle of Theaters (now the Austin Creative Alliance) and initiated its Midwinter Festival of Music (1998–2002), a series of unique concerts and operas performed over six successive weekends. Local performers and guests from Europe and Canada came together for performances of Handel's Rinaldo and Alcina, Purcell's King Arthur, and other works from the diverse early music repertoire ranging from Hildegard of Bingen's chants to Sephardic love songs to lieder by Schubert and Beethoven.

Since 2003, TEMP has offered audiences a concert season between the months of September and May. Many concert programs are brought back by popular demand in successive seasons, including "Convivencia: The Three Worlds of Spain" (repeated in 2004, 2005, and 2010) and "The Play of Daniel" (repeated 2003-2005).

More recently, in 2012, the ensemble performed Hildegard of Bingen's Ordo Virtutum to a sold-out concert hall in downtown Austin.

Awards and honors

2006- Austin Critic's Table - Best Choral Concert for "Monteverdi's Vespers of the Blessed Virgin, 1610"
2005- Austin Critic's Table - Best Choral Concert for "Pathways to Bach"
2003- Austin Critic's Table - Best Chamber Concert for "Veris Dulcis"
2011- Austin Critic's Table - Best Chamber Concert for "Convivencia: Worlds of Renaissance Spain"

Past and Current Performers

Laurie Young Stevens, violin, concertmistress
Abby Green, mezzo-soprano, bouzouki, percussion
Allison Welch, oboe, alto
Annette Bauer, winds, percussion
Becky Baxter, harp
Boel Gidholm, Baroque violin & viola, vielle
Brent Baldwin, baritone
Brett Barnes, baritone
Brian Pettey, baritone
Bruce Brogdon, lute, theorbo, guitars
Bruce Colson, violin
Cayla Cardiff, mezzo-soprano
Christopher Haritatos, Baroque cello
Christopher LeCluyse, tenor
David Dawson, bass
David Lopez, tenor
David Stevens, tenor
Elaine Barber, harp
Gil Zilkha, bass-baritone
Gitanjali Mathur, soprano
Heidi Hock Kaim, soprano
James Brown, viola da gamba
Jane Leggiero, viola da gamba, Baroque cello
Jeffrey Jones-Ragona, tenor
Jim Garrison, percussion
Joel Nesvadba, tenor
Jonathan Brumley, lute, keyboard
Jonathan Nesvadba, baritone
Jonathan Riemer, tenor
John Walters, viola da gamba, Baroque cello, mandola, vielle, rebec
Jos Milton, tenor
Julie Silva, mezzo-soprano, percussion
Kamran Hooshmand, oud, santur
Karen Burciaga, violin, vielle, viola da gamba
Kathlene Ritch, soprano
Keith Womer, keyboard
Kit Robberson, vielle, viola da gamba
Larisa Montanaro, mezzo-soprano
Lisa Alexander, mezzo-soprano
Meredith Ruduski, soprano
Peter Lohman, tenor	
Philip Baker, organ, bass
Rebecca Muniz, soprano
Scott Horton, lute, theorbo, guitar, oud
Stephanie Prewitt, mezzo-soprano
Steven Olivares, bass
Susan Richter, alto, recorders, shawm
Temmo Korisheli, tenor
Therese Honey, harp
Tom Zajac, shawm, sackbut, bagpipe, recorder, percussion

Recordings

The Texas Early Music Project often release recordings of their live performances. Listed below are several notable examples from their diverse catalogue.

1999- The Bonny Broom and Other Scottish Ballads (Professional studio recording)
2005- The Play of Daniel - A 12th Century Mystery Play
2005- Convivencia - Worlds of Renaissance Spain
2005- Pathways to Bach - Music in Germany in the 17th Century
2007- Celtic Knot - Scottish, Irish, and Breton Music from the 15th-20th Centuries
2007- Paris City Limits - Chansons and Dances by Janequin, Josquin, and Others
2010- Stella Splendens - An Early Christmas Music
2010- Night and Day - Sephardic Songs of Love and Exile

References

External links
Official Site

Early music groups
Texas classical music
Musical groups established in 1987
Musical groups from Austin, Texas
1987 establishments in Texas